Sinead Moriarty (born c. 1971) is a best selling romance novelist of over 13 books.

Life and work
The third of three children, Moriarty was born in Booterstown, Dublin to Aidan and Mary Moriarty about 1971. Her mother was a writer on Irish historical figures like Swift, Yeats, Joyce. Moriarty was educated in Trinity College in Dublin where she did a Bachelor of Arts in French and Spanish. After university she moved to Paris and then London, working as a journalist. When she was in London she began to write fiction and her first novel was published by Penguin Books. Since then she has moved back to Dublin with her husband, and they have three children. She also writes a column for the Irish Independent.

Moriarty was appointed a member of the Arts Council of Ireland in July 2018.

Awards
 2015 The Way We Were won The Irish Independent Popular Fiction Book of the Year
 2021 The New Girl was named Irish Book Awards' Teen and Young Adult Book of the Year

Bibliography
 Seven Letters
 Our Secrets and Lies
 The Good Mother
 The Way We Were
 The Secrets Sisters Keep
 Mad About You
 This Child of Mine
 Me and My Sisters
 Pieces of My Heart
 Who's Life is it Anyway
 In My Sister’s Shoes
 From Here to Maternity
 A Perfect Match
 The Baby Trail
 The New Girl

References 

Irish women novelists
Writers from Dublin (city)
Living people
1970s births